Lawrence Byard Solum (born 1954) is an American legal theorist known for his work in the philosophy of law and constitutional theory. He is the William L. Matheson and Robert M. Morgenthau Distinguished Professor of Law and the Douglas D. Drysdale Research Professor of Law at the University of Virginia School of Law, where he has taught since 2020. He was previously the Carmack Waterhouse Professor of Law at the Georgetown University Law Center.

References

External links
Faculty page
Blog

1954 births
Living people
American legal scholars
Georgetown University Law Center faculty
University of Virginia School of Law faculty
20th-century American lawyers
21st-century American lawyers
University of California, Los Angeles alumni
Harvard Law School alumni